Corkscrew is a steel roller coaster at Michigan's Adventure in Muskegon, Michigan. It was manufactured by Arrow Dynamics. Corkscrew was the park's first roller coaster during the Deer Park days.

Ride experience 
Arrow Dynamics has built several Corkscrew coasters, including the one at Michigan's Adventure, and each has the two corkscrew loops that give this coaster type its name. The ride is 70 feet high and 1,250 feet long. It goes approximately 45 mph and lasts approximately 70 seconds.

Color scheme 
Prior to the park being bought by Cedar Fair, Corkscrew had an all-white track with white supports. The trains were red, white, and blue. After the park was purchased by Cedar Fair, the track was painted orange and the corkscrew portion was painted yellow. The supports were also painted to a teal/green color. The trains were as well given new colors, they now sport a red and yellow paint job. The station was given a face lift as well, changing the wood and white portions to a teal and tan color.

History 
The Corkscrew was added to the park when it was known as Deer Park by then owner Roger Jourden in 1979. It was the first inverting roller coaster in Michigan.

This is one of the oldest original Arrow coasters still in existence. It is the same model and layout as the original Corkscrew at Knott's Berry Farm.

References

External links
Official page

Roller coasters in Michigan
Roller coasters introduced in 1979
Michigan's Adventure